The 17th Central Commission for Discipline Inspection (CCDI) was elected at the 17th National Congress of the Chinese Communist Party on 21 October 2007. Its 1st Plenary Session elected the Secretary, deputy secretaries and the 17th Standing Committee of the CCDI.

Plenums
 1st Plenary Session (22 October 2007)
 2nd Plenary Session (14–16 January 2008)
 3rd Plenary Session (12–14 January 2009)
 4th Plenary Session (19 September 2009)
 5th Plenary Session (11–13 January 2010)

Members

 Gan Yisheng
 Yu Qilong
 Ma Wen (female)
 Ma Zhipeng 
 Wang Wei
 Wang Yong
 Wang Weilu
 Wang Zhengfu (Miao)
 Wang Liying (female)
 Wang Huayuan – expelled from the party in 2009
 Wang Huaqing
 Wang Shouxiang
 Wang Zhigang
 Wang Zhongmin 
 Wang Hemin
 Wang Junlian (female)
 Wang Hongzhang
 Wang Guanzhong
 Wang Lili (female) 
 Zhi Shuping
 Rinqengyai (Tibetan)
 Qiu Baoxing 
 Gou Qingming
 Bater (Mongolian)
 Deng Tiansheng
 Ye Qingchun
 Tian Lipu
 Linghu An
 Feng Shoumiao
 Feng Mingang
 Nian Fuchun 
 Zhu Mingguo (Li)
 Zhu Baocheng
 Liu Yuting
 Liu Yazhou
 Liu Jianhua (female)
 Liu Chunliang
 Liu Xiaorong
 An Limin (female)
 Xu Yunzhao
 Xu Dazhe
 Sun Zhongtong
 Sun Baoshu
 Sun Sijing
 Du Juan (female)
 Du Xuefang (female)
 Du Hengyan
 Li Gang
 Li Xi 
 Li Xiaoxue
 Li Yufu
 Li Liguo
 Li Hanbai (Bai)
 Li Yanzhi (female)
 Li Jinzhang
 Li Faquan
 Li Shishi
 Li Hongfeng 
 Li Qingyin
 Yang Shiqiu
 Yang Chuansheng
 Yang Limin
 Yang Jianting
 Wu Yuliang

 Wu Yuping (female)
 Qiu Xueqiang
 He Ping 
 He Yong
 Shen Deyong
 Song Yuying (female)
 Zhang Jun
 Zhang Yi
 Zhang Rucheng
 Zhang Jinan
 Zhang Jianping
 Zhang Yannong
 Zhang Tiejian
 Zhang Huixin
 Chen Xi
 Chen Wenqing
 Chen Xunqiu
 Chen Jiwa (female)
 Chen Xinquan
 Chen Jiping
 Shao Mingli
 Shao Qiwei
 Fan Yinhua
 Ou Zegao (Tibetan)
 Shang Yong
 Jin Shubo
 Jin Daoming (Manchu) 
 Zhou Ying (female)
 Qu Wanxiang
 Xiang Zongxi
 Zhao Tiechui
 Hu Yumin (female)
 Duan Luding
 Zhu Chunlin
 Yao Zengke
 He Bangjing (female, Bai) 
 He Guoqiang
 Yuan Guiren
 Xu Bin
 Xu Tianliang
 Xu Jingye
 Xi Guohua
 Gao Wusheng
 Guo Yongping
 Guo Yanyan
 Huang Zuoxing
 Huang Shuxian
 Huang Dianzhong
 Cao Kangtai 
 Fu Qiang
 Dong Junshu
 Jiang Wenlan (female) 
 Fu Chengyu
 Fu Wenjuan (female)
 Xie Fuzhan
 Xie Xuezhi
 Xie Zhenhua
 Cai Jihua
 Zang Shengye
 Zang Xianfu
 Luo Shugang
 Zhai Xiaoheng
 Wei Jiafu

References
General
The 17th CCDI composition was taken from this source:
  
Specific

Central Commission for Discipline Inspection
2007 establishments in China

zh:中国共产党第十七届中央纪律检查委员会